Harry on Broadway, Act I, is a two-disc set recorded in 2006. The first disc contains the cast recording from The Pajama Game (2006), and disc two is a selection of new recordings from Thou Shalt Not (2001), now with Harry Connick Jr. featuring Kelli O'Hara.

Track listing

Disc one: The Pajama Game
The Cast Album
"Overture"
"Racing with the Clock" – Ensemble
"A New Town Is a Blue Town" – Harry Connick Jr.
"I'm Not at All in Love" – Kelli O'Hara and Ensemble
"I'll Never Be Jealous Again" – Michael McKean, Roz Ryan
"Hey There" – Harry Connick Jr.
"Sleep Tite" – Devin Richards, Paula Leggett Chase, Kate Chapman, Michael Halling
"Her Is" – Peter Benson, Megan Lawrence
"Once a Year Day" – Harry Connick Jr., Kelli O'Hara and Company
"Once a Year Day Playoff"
"Her Is" – Peter Benson, Joyce Chittick
"Small Talk" – Harry Connick Jr., Kelli O'Hara
"There Once Was a Man" – Harry Connick Jr., Kelli O'Hara
"Factory Music/Slow Down" – Ensemble
"Hey There" – Harry Connick Jr.
"Steam Heat" – Joyce Chittick, David Eggers, Vince Pesce
"The World Around Us" – Harry Connick Jr.
"Hey There Reprise/If You Win You Lose" – Harry Connick Jr., Kelli O'Hara
"Think of the Time I Save" – Michael McKean and Ensemble
"Hernando's Hideaway" – Megan Lawrence, Harry Connick Jr. and Company
"The Three of Us" – Michael McKean, Megan Lawrence
"Seven-and-a-Half Cents" – Kelli O'Hara, Peter Benson and Ensemble
"There Once Was a Man" – Harry Connick. Jr, Kelli O'Hara
"Hernando's Jive"
"The Pajama Game" – Full Company

Disc two: Songs from Thou Shalt Not
Harry Connick Jr. featuring Kelli O'Hara
"Oh, My Dear (Something's Gone Wrong)" – Harry Connick Jr.
"Can't We Tell" – Harry Connick Jr., Kelli O'Hara
"Such Love" – Harry Connick Jr.
"I Like Love More" – Harry Connick Jr., Kelli O'Hara
"My Little World" – Kelli O'Hara
"All Things" – Harry Connick Jr.
"I Need to Be in Love" – Kelli O'Hara
"Oh! Ain't That Sweet" – Harry Connick Jr.
"The Other Hours" – Kelli O'Hara
"Take Advantage" – Harry Connick Jr.
"Take Her to the Mardi Gras" – Harry Connick Jr.

Barnes & Noble Exclusive

Disc Three
The Barnes & Noble exclusive edition adds a bonus third disc featuring two additional tracks:
"There Once Was a Man" – Harry Connick Jr., Kelli O'Hara
"Steam Heat" – Harry Connick Jr., Kelli O'Hara

Musicians

Disc one The Pajama Game
The Cast Album
Harry Connick Jr. – vocals (as Sid Sorokin)
Kelli O'Hara – vocals (as Babe Williams)
Michael McKean – vocals (as Hines)
Richard Poe – vocals (as Mr. Hasler)
Megan Lawrence – vocals (as Gladys)
Joyce Chittick – vocals (as Mae)
Roz Ryan – vocals (as Mabel)
Michael McCormick – vocals (as Ganzenlicker/Pop)
Devin Richards – vocals (ensemble)
Rob Berman – conductor
Chris Fenwick – associate conductor
Marilyn Reynolds – violin
Beth Sturdevant – cello
Steve Kenyon – reeds
John Winder – reeds
Roger Ingram – trumpet
Christian Jaudes – trumpet
John Allred – trombone
Joe Barati – bass trombone
Jim Hershman – guitar
Chris Fenwick – piano
Neal Caine – bass
Paul Pizutti – drums
The Honolulu Heartbreakers – vocals
Andy Barrett – synthesizer programmer
Seymour "Red" Press – musical coordinator

Disc two Songs from Thou Shalt Not
Harry Connick Jr. featuring Kelli O'Hara
Harry Connick Jr. – piano, vocals
Kelli O'Hara – vocals
Charles "Ned" Goold – tenor saxophone
Jonathan DuBose, Jr. – guitar, vocals
Neal Caine – bass
Jonathan Batiste – keyboards, vocals
Arthur Latin II – drums
Marilyn Reynolds – violin (concertmaster)
Sylvia D'Avanzo – violin
Maura Giannini – violin
Suzanne Ornstein – violin
Belinda Whitney – violin
Dale P. Woodiel – violin
Eugene Moye – cello
Beth Sturdevant – cello
Aija Silina – violin
Crystal Garner – viola
Jill Jaffe – viola
Sally Shumway – viola
The Honolulu Heartbreakers – vocals
Rob Berman – conductor
Seymour "Red" Press – contractor
Geoff Burke – music preparation, copyist

Charts
2006 Top Cast Album: #1
2006 Billboard 200: #97

Awards
2007 Grammy Award nomination for "The Pajama Game" cast album (CD1): Best Musical Show Album – Harry Connick Jr. and Tracey Freeman, producers (Richard Adler and Jerry Ross, composers/lyricists) (New Broadway Cast with Harry Connick Jr., Kelli O'Hara and Others)

External links
Audio samples, Sony's official Harry Connick Jr site
Harry on Broadway, Act I, on Harry Connick Jr's official site

Cast recordings
Harry Connick Jr. albums
2006 soundtrack albums
Theatre soundtracks